The Albany Polecats were a minor league baseball team in Albany, Georgia.  They were a low-A-class team that played in the South Atlantic League and were a farm team affiliated with both the Montreal Expos and the Baltimore Orioles during the franchise's tenure in Albany. They played all of their home games at the Paul Eames Sports Complex. While at Paul Eames Sports Complex during their tenure, the stadium was dubbed "Polecat Park," even though the venue was officially named after Paul Eames, a minor-league baseball legend.  During the team’s four years in the South Atlantic League, the Polecats never finished higher than eighth overall in the fourteen-team league. Subpar performance coupled with poor attendance proved too much to bear for the struggling franchise.  Prior the 1996 season, the Albany Polecats were sold and moved north to Salisbury, Maryland, where the franchise became the current-day Delmarva Shorebirds.

List of Albany Polecats players in the MLB
All players are listed in alphabetical order by their surname, with the year(s) they played for Albany in parentheses.

Shane Andrews (1992)
Armando Benítez (1993)
Yamil Benitez (1992)
Hiram Bocachica (1995)
Jolbert Cabrera (1992)
Howie Clark (1993–1994)
Trace Coquillette (1995)
Tommy Davis (1994)
Joey Dawley (1994)
Rick DeHart (1992)
Jayson Durocher (1995)
Sid Fernandez (1994)
Cliff Floyd (1992)
Brad Fullmer (1995)
Vladimir Guerrero (1995)
Bob Henley (1995)
David Lamb (1994)
Brian Looney (1992)
Troy Mattes (1995)
Miguel Mejia (1993–1994)
David Moraga (1995)
Tommy Phelps (1995)
Simon Pond (1995)
Jay Powell (1993)
Jeremy Powell (1995)
Al Reyes (1992)
Brian Sackinsky (1993)
Fernando Seguignol (1995)
Garrett Stephenson (1993)
Mike Thurman (1995)
Ugueth Urbina (1992)
Javier Vázquez (1995)
B.J. Waszgis (1993)

Year-by-year record

References

Baltimore Orioles minor league affiliates
Defunct South Atlantic League teams
Montreal Expos minor league affiliates
Professional baseball teams in Georgia (U.S. state)
Sports in Albany, Georgia
1992 establishments in Georgia (U.S. state)
1995 disestablishments in Georgia (U.S. state)
Baseball teams established in 1992
Baseball teams disestablished in 1995
Defunct baseball teams in Georgia